Hammond's Knoll is a  long sandbank off the coast of Norfolk, England at Happisburgh, to the east of Haisborough Sands. The sandbank has lighted buoys at its north and east ends.

Ships wrecked on Hammond's Knoll
Some of the ships wrecked here include:

HMS Invincible - 1801 with the loss of 400 lives.
 Galatea - 1898
SS English Trader - 1941

See also
Haisborough Sands - nearby sandbank, similarly treacherous
Scroby Sands

References

Sandbanks of the North Sea
Coastal features of Norfolk
Landforms of Norfolk
Sandbanks of England